Hüseyin Kartal  (born January 1, 1982 in Eğirdir) is a Turkish professional retired footballer who played as a forward.

Club career
Kartal has played for Ankaragücü, Ankaraspor and Denizlispor in the Turkish Süper Lig. He joined in January 2009 to Kasımpaşa S.K. and left after three and a half year Diyarbakırspor.

International career
Kartal appeared in two matches for the senior Turkey national football team. He made his debut as a last-minute substitute in a 2003 FIFA Confederations Cup match against the United States on 19 June 2003. His second appearance, against Cameroon two days later, also lasted only a minute! One of the shortest two-match international careers of all time.

Honours
Turkey
FIFA Confederations Cup third place: 2003

References

External links

1982 births
Living people
People from Eğirdir
Turkish footballers
Turkey international footballers
Turkey B international footballers
2003 FIFA Confederations Cup players
Malatyaspor footballers
Göztepe S.K. footballers
Diyarbakırspor footballers
Denizlispor footballers
Ankaraspor footballers
MKE Ankaragücü footballers
Turkey under-21 international footballers
Turkey youth international footballers
Yeni Malatyaspor footballers
Association football forwards
Süper Lig players
TFF First League players
TFF Second League players